Tittie Butte is a summit in Wheeler County, Oregon, in the U.S. with an elevation of  .

See also
 Breast-shaped hill

References

Buttes of Oregon
Mountains of Wheeler County, Oregon
Mountains of Oregon